Darwood Kenneth Smith (September 8, 1929 – May 15, 2002), also known as Darwood Kaye, was an American child actor most notable for his semi-regular role as the bookish rich kid Waldo in the Our Gang short subjects series from 1937 to 1940. As an adult, Smith became a Seventh-day Adventist pastor, ministering at several churches until his death in 2002.

Kaye was "discovered" in 1935 while his family was on vacation in Hollywood, California; he was asked to come to the studios for a screen test, and made some uncredited appearances in films in 1936.

Our Gang
Kaye had a small role in Hal Roach's 1937 Our Gang comedy Glove Taps. His first speaking part was in Hearts Are Thumps, released the same year. In most of his Our Gang appearances, Kaye portrayed "Waldo", a rich kid with an officious, studious nature who competed with schoolmates "Alfalfa" Switzer and "Butch" Bond for the affections of little Darla Hood.

Kaye appeared with other Our Gang cast members in live performances in the early 1940s. A 1940 Fort Worth Star-Telegram article about the Our Gang cast said that Kaye and another cast member "display the most essential characteristics of actors in that neither is affected by the constantly unsympathetic roles they must play. Darwood is easily recognizable as a 'regular guy' in any juvenile company and conducts himself with good manners and lack of effrontery which distinguish him from Waldo." According to Variety, he and Switzer performed "an eccentric tap routine which registered well for nice laughs and applause" in San Antonio in late December 1940.

Kaye remained a semi-regular in Our Gang through 1940, by which time production of the series had moved from the Hal Roach studio to Metro-Goldwyn-Mayer. He appeared in a total of 21 Our Gang films. After leaving the Our Gang series Kaye appeared as "Waldo" in Barnyard Follies at Republic Pictures in late 1940. Minor roles in other films included the musical Best Foot Forward (1943) and Kansas City Kitty (1944); in both he played "Killer".

Pastor Smith
After serving in the United States Army for a year and a half, Smith attended La Sierra University, a Seventh-day Adventist college in Riverside, California. He married another student attending La Sierra, Jean Venden, in June 1951, with whom he had four sons: Dan, David, Richard, and Donald.

Smith became a minister in the Seventh-day Adventist Church, ministering at churches in the nearby cities of San Diego, Palm Springs, Escondido, Santa Maria, Oceanside. and in northern California at the Saint Helena SDA church.

In 1957, the Smiths moved to Siam (present day Thailand), where Darwood, now known as Pastor Ken Smith, did missionary work. Three years later, the couple's fourth son, Donald, was born in Bangkok. The Smiths remained in Thailand for fourteen years before going back to the U.S. permanently. Smith continued his clerical career, ministering in several Southern California churches and supervising missionary work.

Death and legacy
On May 15, 2002, Smith was severely injured in a hit and run accident on Arlington Avenue in Riverside, California. He died later that evening at Riverside Community Hospital, surrounded by his family. He was buried at the Crestlawn Memorial Park in Riverside.

His son David wrote the biography Finding Waldo: From Little Rascal to Adventist Pastor by Darwood Kaye (Pacific Press, 2009).

References

External links

 
 
 

1929 births
2002 deaths
American male child actors
American Seventh-day Adventists
Burials in Riverside County, California
Male actors from Colorado
Actors from Fort Collins, Colorado
Seventh-day Adventist religious workers
Seventh-day Adventist missionaries in Thailand
Pedestrian road incident deaths
Road incident deaths in California
American male comedy actors
Hal Roach Studios actors
Our Gang